Christine Exeter (born 3 September 1992) is a footballer who plays as a forward. Born in Canada, she represented Jamaica at senior international level.

Early life
She began playing youth soccer at age 6 with Pickering SC. She later played youth soccer with Ajax SC. In 2004, at the age of 11, she was a recipient of the Bob Marley Award, which is given out to Jamaican-Canadians whose works have elevated the city of Toronto.

College career
In 2010, she began attending the University of Louisville, where she played for the women's soccer team on a soccer scholarship. In 2010, she was named the Big East Rookie of the Year, after she led her team with seven goals. In 2011, she was named an NSCAA Third Team All-American, the Big East Conference Offensive Player of the Year, and a First Team All-Big East, helping the team clinch the program's first ever Big East National Division title. In 2012, she was named to the Third Team All-Big East and was a nominee for the Hermann Trophy.

Club career
In 2010 and 2011, she played for the Toronto Lady Lynx in the USL W-League. She was named to the 2011 W-League All-Star team.

In 2022, she played for Darby FC in League1 Ontario. She was named a league Third Team All-Star in 2022.

International career
Born in Canada, Exeter was also eligible to represent St. Vincent & the Grenadines, where her father was born, and Jamaica, where her mother was born.

In 2008, she was called up to a Canada U17 camp for the first time. She won a silver medal with the Canada U20 at the 2012 CONCACAF Women’s Under-20 Championship and also played at the 2012 FIFA U-20 Women’s World Cup. She scored her first international goal at the U20 World Cup on August 27 against North Korea U20.

In 2015, she switched to begin representing the Jamaica women's national football team. She was named team captain ahead of her third game.

References

External links 

 Christine Exeter at Louisville Cardinals website
 

1992 births
Living people
Citizens of Jamaica through descent
Jamaican women's footballers
Women's association football forwards
Louisville Cardinals women's soccer players
Jamaica women's international footballers
Jamaican people of Saint Vincent and the Grenadines descent
Jamaican expatriate women's footballers
Jamaican expatriate sportspeople in the United States
Expatriate women's soccer players in the United States
Soccer players from Toronto
Canadian women's soccer players
Black Canadian women's soccer players
Canadian people of Saint Vincent and the Grenadines descent
Canadian sportspeople of Jamaican descent
Canadian expatriate women's soccer players
Canadian expatriate sportspeople in the United States
Pickering FC (women) players
Toronto Lady Lynx players
Darby FC players
League1 Ontario (women) players